Robert Hattaway (born November 5, 1936) was an American politician in the state of Florida. He is a realtor by profession.

Hattaway was born in Altamonte Springs and attended the Florida Real Estate School. He served in the Florida House of Representatives for the 33rd district from 1974 to 1982, as a Democrat. He lives in Altamonte Springs.

References

Living people
1936 births
Democratic Party members of the Florida House of Representatives